An outdoor 1926 bronze statue of Abraham Lincoln by Armenian American artist Haig Patigian is installed in Civic Center, San Francisco, California.

See also
 1926 in art
 Abraham Lincoln cultural depictions
 List of sculptures of presidents of the United States
 List of statues of Abraham Lincoln
 Memorials to Abraham Lincoln

References

External links
 
 Abraham Lincoln statue at the City Hall in San Francisco, California at DC Memorials

1926 establishments in California
1926 sculptures
Bronze sculptures in California
Civic Center, San Francisco
Monuments and memorials in California
Monuments and memorials to Abraham Lincoln in the United States
Outdoor sculptures in San Francisco
Sculptures of men in California
Statues in San Francisco
San Francisco